An emergency baptism is a baptism administered to a person in danger of death. This can be done by a person not normally authorized to administer the sacraments.

Catholicism

Latin Church
In the Latin Church of the Catholic Church, the ordinary minister of baptism is a bishop, priest, or deacon (canon 861 §1 of the 1983 Code of Canon Law), and in normal circumstances, only the parish priest of the person to be baptized, or someone authorized by the parish priest may do so licitly (canon 530). "If the ordinary minister is absent or impeded, a catechist or some other person deputed to this office by the local Ordinary, may lawfully confer baptism; indeed, in a case of necessity, any person who has the requisite intention may do so (canon 861 §2), even a non-Catholic or a non-Christian.

By "a case of necessity" is principally meant imminent danger of death because of either illness or an external threat. "The requisite intention" is, at the minimum level, the intention "to do what the Church does" through the rite of baptism.

The Latin Church considers that the effect of the sacrament is not produced by the person who baptizes, but by the Holy Spirit.

In English, the formula to be employed in order to ensure the baptism is valid is thus: The person pours water over the head of the one to be baptized while saying, "N., I baptize you in the name of the Father, and of the Son, and of the Holy Spirit." ("N" is replaced by the subject's name.)

Eastern Christianity
In the Eastern Catholic Churches, a deacon is not considered an ordinary minister of baptism. Administration of the sacrament is reserved, as in the Latin Church, to the parish priest. But, "in case of necessity, baptism can be administered by a deacon or, in his absence or if he is impeded, by another cleric, a member of an institute of consecrated life, or by any other Christian faithful; even by the mother or father, if another person is not available who knows how to baptize" (canon 677 of the Code of Canons of the Eastern Churches.)

The discipline of the Eastern Orthodox Church, Oriental Orthodoxy and the Assyrian Church of the East is similar to that of the Eastern Catholic Churches. However, they require the baptizer, even in cases of necessity, to be of their own faith, on the grounds that a person cannot convey what he himself does not possess, in this case membership in the Body of Christ.

Lutheranism
In Lutheranism, liturgical books such as the Lutheran Book of Worship provide the rite of emergency baptism. If a pastor is not available, "anyone who is baptised can perform the baptism."

Anglicanism
Similar provisions exist throughout the constituent churches of the Anglican Communion, of which the Episcopal Church in the United States of America is one example as below.

For the Episcopal Church in the United States of America, the 1979 Book of Common Prayer states that "Holy Baptism is especially appropriate at the Easter Vigil, on the day of Pentecost, on All Saints' Day or the Sunday after All Saints' day, and on the Feast of the Baptism of our Lord . . . It is recommended that, as far as possible, Baptisms be reserved for these occasions or when a bishop is present. If on any one of the above-named days the ministry of a bishop or priest cannot be obtained, the bishop may specially authorize a deacon to preside.  In that case, the deacon omits the prayer over the candidates, page 308, and the formula and action which follow."  The Book of Common Prayer also specifies under the heading "Emergency Baptism" the following:

Methodism
For Methodists, as well as some High Church Protestant denominations, the ordinary minister of baptism is a duly ordained or appointed minister of religion.

Infants, babies, and fetuses
The Roman Ritual declares that a child is not to be baptized while still enclosed (clausus) in its mother's womb; it supposes that the baptismal water cannot reach the body of the child. When, however, this seems possible, even with the aid of an instrument, Benedict XIV declares that midwives should be instructed to confer conditional baptism. The Ritual further says that when the water can flow upon the head of the infant the sacrament is to be administered absolutely; but if it can be poured only on some other part of the body, baptism is indeed to be conferred, but it must be conditionally repeated in case the child survives its birth. In these last two cases, the rubric of the Ritual supposes that the infant has partly emerged from the womb. For if the fetus was entirely enclosed, baptism is to be repeated conditionally in all cases.

In case of the death of the mother, the fetus is to be immediately extracted and baptized, should there be any life in it. Infants have been taken alive from the womb well after the mother's death. After the Cæsarean incision has been performed, the fetus may be conditionally baptized before extraction if possible; if the sacrament is administered after its removal from the womb the baptism is to be absolute, provided it is certain that life remains. If after extraction it is doubtful whether it be still alive, it is to be baptized under the condition: "If thou art alive". According to Catholic teaching, the fetus is animated by a human soul from the very beginning of its conception. In cases of delivery where the issue is a mass that is not certainly animated by human life, it is to be baptized conditionally: "If thou art a man."

Controversial baptisms of Jews
In 1858, Edgardo Mortara, then reportedly six years old, was taken from his Jewish parents by the police of the Papal States. He had reportedly been baptized, when he was one, by a Roman Catholic servant girl of the family while he was ill, because she feared that otherwise he would not be saved if he died.

The Jewish orphans controversy is a legal dispute that occurred after the Second World War when the Holy See under Pope Pius XII issued instructions that Catholic institutions and families should keep baptized Jewish children in their ranks after they had been rescued from a likely deportation to Auschwitz. The Church, however, maintains it returned such children to their relatives, if any could be found.

See also

 Deathbed conversion

References

See also

Conditional baptism
Baptism of the dead

Baptism